Thomas Andrew Jackson (4 February 1890 – 30 September 1918) was a Scottish professional footballer who played as a centre half in the Football League for Middlesbrough. He also played in the Scottish League for Aberdeen and St Mirren.

Personal life 
Jackson was a member of a sporting family: his father Andrew was capped for Scotland in the 1880s and his uncle Jimmy and cousins James and Archie all played in the Football League. A younger cousin Archie Jackson was a prominent Australian cricketer. Prior to becoming a professional footballer, Jackson worked as an apprentice moulder for Fullerton, Hodgart & Barclay in Paisley.

In November 1915, 18 months after the outbreak of the First World War, he enlisted in the Lovat Scouts, shortly afterwards being transferred to the Queen's Own Cameron Highlanders and  rising to the rank of sergeant in that unit. Jackson was wounded during the Hundred Days Offensive in late 1918 and died of his wounds at 36th Casualty Clearing Station, Watten on 30 September 1918. He was buried in the Haringhe (Bandaghem) Military Cemetery, Belgium.

Career statistics

References

1890 births
1918 deaths
Sportspeople from Cambuslang
Scottish footballers
English Football League players
Middlesbrough F.C. players
British Army personnel of World War I
Lovat Scouts soldiers
Queen's Own Cameron Highlanders soldiers
British military personnel killed in World War I
St Mirren F.C. wartime guest players
Association football wing halves
Scottish Football League players
Aberdeen F.C. wartime guest players
Ardrossan Winton Rovers F.C. players
Scottish Junior Football Association players
Moldmakers
Footballers from South Lanarkshire